The governor of Pampanga is the local chief executive of the Philippine province of Pampanga.

List of governors of Pampanga

References

Government of Pampanga
Governors of provinces of the Philippines